The 1931 Chatham Cup was the ninth annual nationwide knockout football competition in New Zealand.

The competition was run on a regional basis, with six regional associations (Auckland, Walkato, Wellington, Manawatu, Canterbury, and Otago) each holding separate qualifying rounds. In all, 30 teams took part in the competition, though some reports suggest there may have been 31 teams, and for the first time the majority came from the South Island. This was an improvements over previous years, but still a tiny number considering that 514 teams were affiliated to the regional associations nationwide. Participation by Auckland teams was particularly poor, with only three sides from that city taking part.

Participants
The following 30 teams are known to have taken part in the competition:

Auckland
Ponsonby
Auckland YMCA
Tramurewa
South Auckland (Waikato)
Renown (Huntly)
Rotowaro (Huntly)
Huntly Thistle
Wanganui
Wanganui East Athletic
Manawatu
St. Andrew's (Palmerston North)

Wellington
Diamond (Wellington)
Hospital (Porirua)
Petone
Seatoun
Waterside (Wellington)
Wellington Marist
Westland (West Coast)
Cobden (Greymouth)
Dobson
Greymouth
Rewanui (Runanga)
Taylorville (Dobson)

Canterbury
Christchurch Rangers
Christchurch Thistle
New Brighton
Nomads (Christchurch)
Saint Albans
Technical Old Boys (Christchurch)
Western (Christchurch)
Otago
Maori Hill (Dunedin)
Mosgiel
Northern (Dunedin)
Port Chalmers
Seacliff

The 1931 final
The final was won by Tramurewa, a recent amalgamation of former winners Tramways and Manurewa, soon to be renamed Manurewa AFC. In all, six of Tramurewa's player had played for Tramways in the 1929 final. In the final almost all of the action occurred in the second half. A. Wilson was the first scorer for Nomads, followed two minutes later by G. Goode. Clem Bell then scored twice to leave the scores tied at 2-2. Nomads defended stoutly to keep the scores tied until full-time, but in the first period of extra time both H., Donaldson and Arthur Spong scored for the Auckland team. The goal tally was completed just before the end of the second period of extra time by Bell's third goal.

Tramurewa's Clem Bell was the second player in Chatham Cup history to score a final hat-trick, and also the second player to score in two separate finals (he scored in Tramways' win in 1929). The tally of seven goals scored in the game was the highest aggregate until 1940.

Results

Semi-finals ("Island finals")

Final

References

Rec.Sport.Soccer Statistics Foundation New Zealand 1931 page

Chatham Cup
Chatham Cup
Chatham Cup